Yu Hsiao-cheng is a Taiwanese politician. He was the Deputy Chairperson of the National Communications Commission (NCC) of the Executive Yuan.

NCC Deputy Chairmanship

NCC Deputy Chairperson Appointment
Yu, a professor at the National Chiao Tung University, was nominated by the Executive Yuan to the office title in May 2012. He was accused by the Democratic Progressive Party due to his dual ROC-US citizenship. However, he said that he would renounce his US citizenship once he was appointed to be the NCC Deputy Chairperson. However, Yu has not made further statement after becoming the speak person of NCC. In addition to the dual citizenship controversy, Yu's communication skills were remarkable. In the Sunflower Student Movement, Yu persisted that NCC had made the right call to support Cross-Strait Service Trade Agreement and constantly made comments suggesting that academic professionals were isolated from industry. During his visit to National Chiao Tung University, Yu made no comment towards questions and suggestions.

References

Political office-holders in the Republic of China on Taiwan
Living people
Academic staff of the National Chiao Tung University
Georgia Tech alumni
Chung Yuan Christian University alumni
Year of birth missing (living people)